Chromosome transmission fidelity protein 8 homolog is a protein that in humans is encoded by the CHTF8 gene.

This gene encodes a short protein that forms part of the Ctf18 replication factor C (RFC) complex that occurs in both yeast and mammals. The heteroheptameric RFC complex plays a role in sister chromatid cohesion and may load the replication clamp PCNA (proliferating cell nuclear antigen) onto DNA during DNA replication and repair. 

This gene is ubiquitously expressed and has been shown to have reduced expression in renal and prostate tumors. Alternative splicing results in multiple variants encoding different isoforms. This gene has a pseudogene on chromosome X.

References

External links

Further reading